Bănel Nicoliță (born 7 January 1985) is a Romanian professional footballer, currently under contract with CS Făurei.

Club career

Dacia Unirea Brăila and Politehnica Timișoara
He made his debut in Romanian Liga II, playing for Dacia Unirea Brăila. After, he joined Politehnica Timișoara, making his Divizia A debut at the age of 19. However, he made only 15 league appearances for the club before moving to Steaua București, at the beginning of 2005, he signed a 5-year contract with Steaua.

Steaua București
Shortly after joining Steaua, Nicoliță won his first Liga I title upon his first season with the team. He is known as a humble and hard-working, though not very technical, speed and quickness are his strengths. Interestingly enough on the video game PES 6 his skill set as a player matched all his commonly agreed upon strengths (including being humble), but he was also graced with technical ability and was able to play very effectively as a box to box midfielder with very tidy feet.

In the spring of 2006, he scored twice in the match against Real Betis, his goals opening Steaua's door to the quarterfinals of the UEFA Cup, and then he scored again in the quarterfinals, this time against Rapid București to help his team reach the semifinals.

On 1 November 2006, he scored an own goal against Real Madrid in a Champions League encounter. Unfortunately for him and the Romanian side, this turned out to be decisive in the outcome of the match. He claimed he couldn't sleep for 48 hours after scoring it. After a game with FC Argeș, Romanian newspaper Gazeta Sporturilor named him Bănelinho.

On 27 August 2008, he has scored one goal in the match against Galatasaray, in the third qualifying round of UEFA Champions League, which sent Steaua București to the group stage for the third consecutive year.

Starting with the 2010–11 season, Bănel was the new captain of Steaua, but with the arrival of new coach Ilie Dumitrescu, he soon gave his armband to Cristian Tănase.

Saint-Étienne
On 30 August 2011, Saint-Étienne announced on their official website that they had found agreement with Steaua for Nicoliță's transfer and that the player would fly to France and undergo a medical the following day. Being in his last year of contract with Steaua București the transfer fee was €700.000. He signed a contract worth €400.000 per year.

On 6 November he scored his first goal helping Saint-Étienne draw against second place Montpellier. In a game against Sochaux Nicoliță offered the assist for teenager Zouma to give Saint-Étienne the win. After only six months with the French team he became a leader scoring 3 goals and offering 3 assists after his first 11 appearances. In February 2012 Nicoliță hit a rough patch, having a couple of not so convincing games, being described as monotonous. In March, he was sidelined for a couple of weeks, due to ligament problems. He recovered in late March 2012 and played in the games against Montpellier and Olympique Lyonnais, both 1–0 defeats.

Loan to Nantes
On 2 September 2013, Ligue 1 club FC Nantes confirmed Nicoliță was signed on a season long loan from Saint-Étienne.
He made an assist for his first match against FC Sochaux.

International career
Nicoliță won 34 caps for Romania up to date and scored one goal. He also used to be a Romanian U21 international.

On 25 March 2008, he was decorated by the president of Romania, Traian Băsescu for the results on Qualifying to EURO 2008 and qualification to UEFA Euro 2008 Group C with Medalia "Meritul Sportiv" — (The Medal "The Sportive Merit") class II with two barret.

He was captain for the first time in the friendly against San Marino on 11 August 2011.

Personal life
Nicoliță is an ethnic Romani/Gypsy, one of six brothers raised by his mother in the small, impoverished town of Făurei, Nicoliță grew up determined to succeed and his speed and diligence on the field are proof of his unalloyed passion for the game.

One of his brothers, Stelian is also a professional footballer who played for CF Brăila and other teams in the lower leagues of Romania. Bănel and Stelian played together at their hometown team CS Făurei.

Nicoliță has been nicknamed Jardel after the famous Mário Jardel of Brazil.

Career statistics

Club

Statistics accurate as of match played 2 September 2014

International goals 
Scores and results list Romania's goal tally first. "Score" column indicates the score after the player's goal.

Honours

References

External links
  
 
 

1985 births
Living people
People from Brăila County
Romanian Romani people
Romanian footballers
Romani footballers
Association football wingers
Association football fullbacks
Liga I players
Liga III players
Ligue 1 players
Cypriot First Division players
AFC Dacia Unirea Brăila players
FC Politehnica Timișoara players
FC Steaua București players
AS Saint-Étienne players
FC Nantes players
FC Viitorul Constanța players
ASA 2013 Târgu Mureș players
Aris Limassol FC players
Romanian expatriate footballers
Expatriate footballers in France
Romanian expatriate sportspeople in France
Expatriate footballers in Cyprus
Romanian expatriate sportspeople in Cyprus
Romania under-21 international footballers
Romania international footballers
UEFA Euro 2008 players
Romanian football managers